Natalia Leipus (born 10 April 1962) is an Australia former professional tennis player.

Leipus, a South Australian, made the round of 16 in the mixed doubles at the 1984 Wimbledon Championships. She and partner Peter Doohan were competing in the draw as lucky losers from qualifying and it was the only grand slam main draw appearance of her career.

Her brother Andrew Leipus is a physiotherapist, most known for his time working for the India national cricket team.

ITF finals

Doubles: 2 (1–1)

References

External links
 
 

1962 births
Living people
Australian female tennis players
Tennis people from South Australia